Davisville may refer to:
 Davisville, former name of Davis, California
 Davisville, Missouri, unincorporated community in Missouri, United States
 Davisville, New Jersey, unincorporated community in Burlington County
 Davisville, Rhode Island, former home of the U.S. Navy SeaBees
 Davisville, West Virginia, unincorporated community in West Virginia, United States
 Davisville Village, neighbourhood of Toronto, Ontario, Canada
 Davisville (TTC), subway stop in Toronto, Ontario, Canada
 Davisville Subway Yard, the first subway yard in Toronto
 Davisville, Wentworth Falls, a heritage-listed house in Wentworth Falls, in the Blue Mountains region of New South Wales, Australia